Pillow Man may refer to:

 The Pillowman, a 2003 play by Irish playwright Martin McDonagh
 Prince Randian, a sideshow performer nicknamed "Pillow Man"
 "Pillow Man," a track on Raw (Hopsin album)